Mushika dynasty, also spelled Mushaka, was a minor dynastic power that held sway over the region in and around Mount Ezhi (Ezhimala) in present-day North Malabar, Kerala, India. The country of the Mushikas, ruled by an ancient lineage of the Hehaya clan of the same name, appears in early historic (pre-Pallava) south India and it is believed that Mushika dynasty has their descents from Heheya Kingdom. Early Tamil poems contain several references to the exploits of Nannan of Ezhimalai. Nannan was known as a great enemy of the pre-Pallava Chera chieftains. The clan also had matrimonial alliances with the Chera, Pandya and Chola chieftains. The Kolathunadu (Kannur) Kingdom, which was the descendant of Mushika dynasty, at the peak of its power, reportedly extended from Netravati River (Mangalore) in the north to Korapuzha (Kozhikode) in the south with Arabian Sea on the west and Kodagu hills on the eastern boundary, also including the isolated islands of Lakshadweep in the Arabian Sea.

The Mushika/Ezhimala kingdom/chiefdom gradually developed into a monarchical polity (known as Kolla-desam) in the early medieval period. The medieval Mushikas were considered as Kshatriyas of Soma Vamsa. The hereditary title of the Mushika kings in the medieval period was Ramaghata Musaka (Tamil/Malayalam: Iramakuta Muvar). The Mushaka Vamsa Kavya, a dynastic chronicle composed in the 11th century by poet Athula, describes the history of the Mushika lineage.

Mushika kingdom came under the influence of Chera/Perumal kingdom in the 11th century AD. Mushika royals seem to have assisted the Chera/Perumal kings in their struggle against the Chola Empire. Two subsequent Chola inscriptions (c. 1005 AD, Rajaraja I and c. 1018–19, Rajadhiraja) mention the defeat of the Kolla-desam and the fall of the Iramakuta Muvar. The presence of the Cholas in north Kerala (1020 AD) is confirmed by the Eramam inscription. The kingdom survived the Chera/Perumal state, and came to be known as Kolathunad (Kannur-Kasaragod area) in the post-Chera/Perumal period.

The Mushika kings appear to have encouraged a variety of merchant guilds in their kingdom. Famous Indian guilds such as the anjuvannam, the manigramam, the valanchiyar and the nanadeshikal show their presence in the kingdom. The kings are also described as great champions of Hindu religion and temples. Some Mushika rulers are known for their patronage to a famous Buddhist vihara in central Kerala. Presence of Jewish merchants is also speculated in the ports of Mushika kingdom. A location in Madayi is still known as "the Jew's pond" (the Jutakkulam).

Etymology 
Tamil name "Ezhimalai" (the Ezhil Kunram) for the term "Mushika" or "Mushaka" in Sanskrit. The name was incorrectly pronounced as "Elimala" ("the Mountain of the Rats") also.

The Ezhimala hill is described in Mushaka Vamsa Kavya as the "Mushaka Parvata".

Origins 
The ancient ruling family of the Ezhimala seems to have existed in northern Kerala at least from early historic (pre-Pallava) period.

Ancient Tamil poems also describe th chiefdom of Ezhimalai (also Ezhilmalai) on the northern edge of Tamilakam on its west (Malabar) coast. The rulers of Ezhilmalai were the most prominent hill chieftains of ancient Kerala. The port known as Naravu was located in Ezhimalai chiefdom (Akam, 97). The "Muvan" chieftain of the early Tamil poems, described as an adversary of the early Chera chieftains, is also identical with the Muvan of Ezhimalai.

The early historic Ezhimala clan had matrimonial alliances with the Chera, Pandya and Chola chieftains.

Mahabharata, the Sanskrit epic poem of ancient India, also mention the Mushika as one of the kingdoms of the deep South of India, and is grouped with the Cheras, Pandyas and Cholas. It is identified both as the Ay/Venad/Thiruvithamkur dynasty as well as the Nannan/Mushika/Kolathiri dynasty.

Ezhimala Nannan 
Nannan was a velir-level chieftain of Ezhimalai ("the Ezhil Kunram"). Nannan is known as a great enemy of the early (pre-Pallava) Chera chieftains (western Tamil Nadu and central Kerala). He appeas in Akananuru and Purananuru poems, and also in Natrinai, in Pathitruppathu and in Kurunthokai. He is described as the hunter chieftain of the vetar descent group ("vetar-ko-man").

Early Tamil poems contain several references to the exploits of Ezhimalai Nannan (who was also known as the lord of Konkanam).

 Poet Kudavayur Kirattanar speaks about the defeat of certain Pazhayan by Nannan and his associates Ettai, Atti, Gangan, Katti and Punthurai. In another battle Nannan defeated a chieftain called Pindan (Akam, 152, and Natrinai, 270).
 When Nannan invaded Punnad, the Chera warriors came to the aid of the people of that country. It seems that Nannan managed to defeat Ay Eyinan, the leader of the Chera warriors, in the ensuing battle at Pazhi. The warriors of Nannan were led by a person called Minjili in this battle (Akam, 141, 181, and 396, and Natrinai, 265).
 However, poem 351 and poem 396 from the Purananuru describe Nannan and Ay Eyinan as relatives and as extremely close friends. So intimate was their relationship that Nannan renamed the "Pirampu" hills in his domain as "Aypirampu".
 In the meanwhile, Kosar people from Chellur (identified present day Taliparamba) attacked Ezhimala country, and even cut down the vakai (albizia), the tutelary tree of Nannan. Nannan defeated the Kosars with help of Chola Ilanchettu Chenni, but Pazhi was sacked by the Cholas (Kurunthokai, 73 and Akam, 375).
 Nannan was killed in a battle at Vakai Perumthurai by Chera Narmudi Cheral (Pathitruppattu, IV).

Jurisdiction
The ancient port of Naura, which is mentioned in the Periplus of the Erythraean Sea as a port somewhere north of Muziris is identified with Kannur.

Pliny the Elder (1st century CE) states that the port of Tyndis was located at the northwestern border of Keprobotos (Chera dynasty). The region, which lies north of the port at Tyndis, was ruled by the kingdom of Ezhimala during Sangam period. According to the Periplus of the Erythraean Sea, a region known as Limyrike began at Naura and Tyndis. However the Ptolemy mentions only Tyndis as the Limyrike'''s starting point. The region probably ended at Kanyakumari; it thus roughly corresponds to the present-day Malabar Coast. The value of Rome's annual trade with the region was estimated at around 50,000,000 sesterces. Pliny the Elder mentioned that Limyrike was  prone by pirates. The Cosmas Indicopleustes mentioned that the Limyrike was a source of peppers.Das, Santosh Kumar (2006). The Economic History of Ancient India. Genesis Publishing Pvt Ltd. p. 301.

Ezhimala dynasty had jurisdiction over two Nadus - The coastal Poozhinadu and the hilly eastern Karkanadu. According to the works of Sangam literature, Poozhinadu consisted much of the coastal belt between Mangalore and Kozhikode. Karkanadu consisted of Wayanad-Gudalur hilly region with parts of Kodagu (Coorg). It is said that Nannan, the most renowned ruler of Ezhimala dynasty, took refuge at Wayanad hills in the 5th century CE when he was lost to Cheras, just before his execution in a battle, according to the Sangam works. The Ezhimala/Mushika Kingdom at the peak of its power, reportedly extended from Netravati River (Mangalore) in the north to Korapuzha (Kozhikode) in the south with Arabian Sea on the west and Kodagu hills on the eastern boundary, also including the isolated islands of Lakshadweep in the Arabian Sea.

Until the 16th century CE, Kasargod town was known by the name Kanhirakode (may be by the meaning, 'The land of Kanhira Trees') in Malayalam. The Kumbla dynasty, who swayed over the land of southern Tulu Nadu wedged between Chandragiri River and Netravati River (including present-day Taluks of Manjeshwar and Kasaragod) from Maipady Palace at Kumbla, had also been vassals to the Kolathunadu/Kolathiri rulers, before the Carnatic conquests of Vijayanagara Empire. The Kumbla dynasty had a mixed lineage of Malayali Nairs and Tuluva Brahmins. They also claimed their origin from Cheraman Perumals of Kerala. Francis Buchanan-Hamilton states that the customs of Kumbla dynasty were similar to those of the contemporary Malayali kings, though Kumbla was considered as the southernmost region of Tulu Nadu.

Entire Tamilakam was a hub of Indian Ocean trade during the era. According to Kerala Muslim tradition, Kolathunadu was home to several oldest mosques in the Indian subcontinent. According to Qissat Shakarwati Farmad, the Masjids at Kodungallur, Kollam, Madayi, Barkur, Mangalore, Kasaragod, Kannur, Dharmadam, Panthalayani, and Chaliyam, were built during the era of Malik Dinar, and they are among the oldest Masjids in the Indian subcontinent. It is believed that Malik Dinar died at Thalangara in Kasaragod town. Most of them lies in the erstwhile region of Ezhimala kingdom. The Koyilandy Jumu'ah Mosque contains an Old Malayalam inscription written in a mixture of Vatteluttu and Grantha scripts which dates back to the 10th century CE. It is a rare surviving document recording patronage by a Hindu king (Bhaskara Ravi) to the Muslims of Kerala.

 Medieval  Mushikas 

The Indian anthropologist Ayinapalli Aiyappan states that a powerful and warlike clan of the Bunt community of Tulu Nadu was called Kola Bari and the Kolathiri Raja of Kolathunadu was a descendant of this clan. The Kolla-desam (or the Mushika-rajya) came under the influence of the Chera/Perumals kingdom during eleventh century AD. The Chola references to several kings in medieval Kerala confirms that the power of the Chera/Perumal was restricted to the country around capital Kodungallur. The Perumal kingship remained nominal compared with the power that local rulers (such as that of the Mushika in the north and Venatu in the south) exercised politically and militarily. In his book on travels (Il Milione), Marco Polo recounts his visit to the area in the mid 1290s. Other visitors included Faxian, the Buddhist pilgrim and Ibn Batuta, writer and historian of Tangiers. The Arabic inscription on a copper slab within the Madayi Mosque in Kannur records its foundation year as 1124 CE.

Medieval Kolla-desam stretched on the banks of Kavvai, Koppam and Valappattanam rivers.

 Mushika rulers from medieval inscriptions (10th - 12th centuries AD) 
 Validhara Vikkirama Rama (c. 929 AD) - mentioned in the Ezhimala-Narayankannur inscription.
 Kantan Karivarman alias Iramakuta Muvar  (c. 1020 AD)  - mentioned in an Eramam inscription of Chera/Perumal Bhaskara Ravi Manukuladitya (962–1021 AD).
 Mushikesvara Chemani/Jayamani (c. 1020 AD) - Tiruvadur inscription.
 Ramakuta Muvar (as a donor to the Tiruvalla temple in Tiruvalla Copper Plates/Huzur Treasury Plates).
 Utaiya-varma alias Ramakuta Muvar (early 12th century AD) - mentioned in the Kannapuram inscription.

 Chola attacks on Mushika kingdom (Kolla-desam) Corrections by M. G. S. Narayanan on K. A. Nilakanta Sastri and Elamkulam P. N. Kunjan Pillai are employed. In 1005 AD, i. e., 20 regnal year of emperor Rajaraja I (985–1014 AD), there is a reference (in the Senur inscription) to the defeat of the "haughty" kings at Kollam, Kolladesam and Kodungallur at the hand of Rajaraja. The Kolladesam is identified with the Mushika kingdom in north Kerala. According to scholars, "plunder is emphasised more than conquest [in the inscription] and it is likely that the victories at Kollam in the south, Kodungallur in the center and Kolladesam in the north of Kerala have been primarily the achievement of [the Chola] naval forces".
 Chola emperor Rajadhiraja (1019–1044–1053/4 AD) is stated to have "confined the undaunted king of Venatu [back] to Che[ra]natu, destroyed the Iramakuta Muvar in anger, and put on a fresh garland of Vanchi flowers after capturing Kantalur Salai [Vizhinjam?] while the strong Villavan [the Chera/Perumal king] hid himself in terror inside the jungle". The Irumakuta Muvar is not named in the above Chola prasasti'' (the above events are dated to around 1018–19 AD).
 The presence of Chola army in north Kerala (1020 AD) is confirmed by the Eramam inscription of Chera/Perumal Bhaskara Ravi Manukuladitya (962–1021 AD)  (which mentions a meeting attended by Rajendra Chola Samaya Senapati in the Chalappuram Temple).

Inscriptions related to Mushika country

Records mentioning Chera/Perumals

Miscellaneous records

Udayavarman Kolattiri 
An inscription discovered from Kannappuram Temple, found fixed on a platform outside the prakara of the temple, in old Malayalam mentions king "Utaiya Varma Ramakuta Muvar". The record give details of land set apart for the expenses of the Kannapuram Temple. The inscription can be attributed to the early years of the 12th century on the basis of script and language.

King Udayavarman of Karippattu palace in Kolattunadu is described as a favourite of the Chera/Perumal king in traditional Kerala chronicles. He is described as the overlord of the Fort Valapattanam, the Chera/Perumal king's Palace, the Taliparamba Temple, and the Perinchellur Brahmin village.

References

Bibliography 
 
 
 
 

History of Kerala
Ancient Tamil Nadu
Kingdoms in the Mahabharata